Burundi competed at the 2018 Summer Youth Olympics in Buenos Aires, Argentina from 6 October to 18 October 2018.

Medalists

Medals awarded to participants of mixed-NOC teams are represented in italics. These medals are not counted towards the individual NOC medal tally.

Athletics

Burundi qualified 3 competitors in athletics for the games.

Judo

Individual

Team

Tennis

Singles

Doubles

References

You
Nations at the 2018 Summer Youth Olympics
Burundi at the Youth Olympics